Kavaki (also Romanized as Kavākī) is a village in Faruj Rural District, in the Central District of Faruj County, North Khorasan Province, Iran. At the 2006 census, its population was 700, in 176 families.

References 

Populated places in Faruj County